The Environment Council (ENVI) is a configuration of the Council of the European Union. It meets about four times a year. It brings together the environment ministers and is responsible for the EU environment policy.

This Council deals with environmental protection, climate change, prudent use of resources and protection of human health.

In this regard, the Council adopts legislation together with the European Parliament in relation to:

protection of natural habitats
clean air and water
proper waste disposal
toxic chemicals
sustainable economy

References

External links
 About the Environment Council
 Press releases of the Environment Council

Council of the European Union
Environmental agencies in the European Union